John Cates may refer to:
 John Henry Cates, businessman and political figure in British Columbia
 John M. Cates, American college football player and coach

See also
 John F. Cates House, Mississippi